Gulgong is a 19th-century gold rush town in the Central Tablelands and the wider Central West regions of the Australian state of New South Wales. The town is situated within the Mid-Western Regional Council local government area. At the 2016 Census, Gulgong had a population of 2,521.

Today, much of the 19th-century character of the town remains, contributing to its appeal as a tourist destination. Of special interest is the Prince of Wales Opera House, a survivor with a rich history.

An attraction of note is the Gulgong Pioneer Museum, which has a huge collection of thematically-displayed exhibits, ranging from kitchen utensils to complete buildings that have been relocated to a "street" on the site. Apart from tourism and hospitality, local industries include wine production, wool, wheat growing and coal mining.

History
The name "Gulgong" is derived from the word used by the traditional inhabitants, the Wiradjuri, for "deep waterhole".

Lieutenant William Lawson passed through the area in November 1820 and again in 1821 and reported good grazing land in the region. This prompted the brothers George and Henry Cox, sons of William Cox, to take up land to the south of the Gudgegong River, while Lawson applied for land grants to the north. Others soon followed, taking up land with river frontage along the Gudgegong. Among the first to take formal possession was Richard Rouse who was granted land in 1825 by Governor Brisbane.

Gulgong came into existence after gold was discovered at Red Hill in 1870. The township was surveyed in August 1870. By the end of that year there were 800 people on the diggings, which yielded over 32 tons of gold in the 1870s. The population had increased to 12,000 by the time the British author Anthony Trollope visited in October 1871.

The population of the town reached 20,000 in 1873. The Gulgong gold field was one of the last to be developed as "poor man's diggings", that is by individuals without substantial capital investment. 

Novelist and bush poet Henry Lawson lived briefly in Gulgong as a child in the early 1870s, while his father sought instant wealth as a miner. A montage of goldrush-era Gulgong street scenes was used as a backdrop to the portrait of Lawson on the first Australian ten dollar note (which was in use from 1966 until replaced by a polymer banknote in November 1993). The town and its surrounding district feature in Lawson's fiction, especially in Joe Wilson and His Mates.

Gulgong is believed to be one of the primary locations in Thomas Alexander Browne's Robbery under Arms. Australia's first novelist of note, Browne was police magistrate in the period 1871-81. He once hosted English author Anthony Trollope, who later recorded his impressions of Australia and New Zealand (1875).

In 1872, Henry Beaufoy Merlin took photographic images on glass-plate negatives of many buildings in Gulgong — with owners, tenants and passers-by — and of gold mines and miners, creating a unique record of life, in the town and its surroundings, at the time of the gold rushes. These images of Gulgong form part of the Holtermann Collection. 

A nearby area on the state register is known as the Talbragar fossil site, containing sometimes excellently preserved specimens of plants, fishes, invertebrates and a previously unknown spider.  In addition, a site known as McGraths Flat about 25 miles northwest of Gulgong contains a recently discovered cache of Miocene era fossils.

Museums 

 Pioneers Museum  The Pioneer Museum is run completely by volunteer members of the Gulgong Historical Society Inc. Situated across a 1.5 acre site in the town centre the museum displays a significant collection of historic objects, including buildings and vehicles relocated from properties across the region. The collection captures the essence of the gold rush history of the town.  

 Gulgong Holtermann Museum  Gulgong Holtermann Museum is a community project and a museum space located in gold rush town of Gulgong, New South Wales. Two of the town's earliest buildings, also featured on Australian ten-dollar note (see The Greatest Wonder) renovated and extended, house an interactive educational and tourist facility based on the UNESCO listed Holtermann Collection - photographs taken for Bernhardt Holtermann during the "roaring days" in the 1870s.  

 Gulgong Gold Experience  The location of the early gold finds in Gulgong has been turned into a Museum and exhibition. Built into Red Hill the site is home to an assortment of original mining equipment and has public access to one of the original mines.

Heritage listings
Gulgong has a number of heritage-listed sites, including:

 Prince of Wales opera house Built by 1871 by John Hart Gogden the Prince of Wales Opera house is the oldest still-operating Opera House in the Southern Hemisphere. The opera house is now owned and operated by the Gulgong Amateur Musical and Dramatical Society.  

 Hobsons Shops Hobsons Shops is a heritage-listed retail building at 75 Herbert Street, Gulgong. It was added to the New South Wales State Heritage Register on 2 April 1999. 

 The Greatest Wonder of the World and American Tobacco Warehouse and Fancy Goods Emporium  The Greatest Wonder of the World and American Tobacco Warehouse and Fancy Goods Emporium are heritage-listed adjacent shops at 123-125 Mayne Street, Gulgong. They were built from 1870 to 1878. They have been refurbished to house the Gulgong Holtermann Museum, with new galleries constructed at the back to house the UNESCO listed HOLTERMANN COLLECTION. The original buildings were added to the New South Wales State Heritage Register on 21 October 2016. 

 Wallerawang-Gwabegar railway Wyaldra Creek railway bridge

 Wallerawang-Gwabegar railway Gulgong railway station

 Mayne St, Belmore St, Herbert St  A large portion of the homes and businesses on Mayne St are of historical significant and protected under Heritage Protection Laws.

Railways
Gulgong is at the junction of the Sandy Hollow line (which runs west from Muswellbrook) and the Gwabegar line (which runs north-south from Gwabegar to Wallerawang). A section of the Gwabegar railway line south of Gulgong to Kandos has been closed since 30 June 2007.

Events

Gulgong is a regular host to both regional and international festivals and events. 

 Clay Gulgong Festival  Gulgong has hosted an international ceramics festival every two to three years since 1989, most recently over April 9 to 15, 2022.  

 Clay Folk Festival  Gulgong also hosts an annual folk festival. 

 The Henry Lawson Festival  The Henry Lawson Festival is an arts festival held annually on the Queen's birthday weekend in Gulgong and Grenfell, New South Wales (NWS), Australia. Henry Lawson, one of Australia's best loved poets and writer of short stories, was born in Grenfell, and he lived in Gulgong for a time as a child.

 Mudgee Classic  The annual Mudgee classic cycling event now incorporates Gulgong into its route, allowing for cyclists to resupply during the event. 

 Gulgong Show  The Gulgong show is a regional agricultural festival attracting over 3500 participants and spectators each year. The show hosts a large number of livestock, arts, food and craft competitions.

Notable people
Jimmy Governor, on whom Thomas Kenneally based his character for The Chant of Jimmy Blacksmith, grew up in the Gulgong district and married there in 1898.
Nancy Hill (born 1934), Australian basketball representative
Josh Jackson, rugby league player
Louisa Lawson, poet and mother of Henry Lawson
Colin McKellar, Australian senator

Gallery

References

External links 

 About Gulgong

Towns in the Central West (New South Wales)
Central Tablelands
Mid-Western Regional Council
Mining towns in New South Wales